James J. Crawford (November 16, 1871 – March 30, 1954) was an American politician from New York.

Life
He was born on November 16, 1871, in New York City, the son of John Thomas Crawford and Mary Ann (Donnelly) Crawford. The family removed to Williamsburg, Brooklyn. He attended Public School No. 17 in Brooklyn.

Crawford was a member of the New York State Senate (11th D.) from 1929 to 1952, sitting in the 152nd, 153rd, 154th, 155th, 156th, 157th, 158th, 159th, 160th, 161st, 162nd, 163rd, 164th, 165th, 166th, 167th and 168th New York State Legislatures. In the senate, he sponsored legislation to legalize betting on races in the state.

Crawford died at his home in Brooklyn at the age of 82.

Sources

1871 births
Democratic Party New York (state) state senators
People from Williamsburg, Brooklyn
1954 deaths